The 125 Squadron of the Israeli Air Force, also known as the  Light Helicopters Squadron, was a Bell 206B helicopter squadron based at Sde Dov Airport.

References

Israeli Air Force squadrons